Umm al-Amad is a Syrian village located in the Subdistrict of the Hama District in the Hama Governorate. According to the Syria Central Bureau of Statistics (CBS), Umm al-Amad had a population of 202 in the 2004 census.

History
In 1838, it was reported as deserted.

References

Bibliography

 

Populated places in Hama District